K. Achuthan is a member of 13th Kerala Legislative Assembly. He belongs to Indian National Congress and represents Chittur constituency. He was previously elected to Kerala Legislative Assembly in 1996, 2001, 2006 and 2011.

References

Members of the Kerala Legislative Assembly
Indian National Congress politicians from Kerala
Living people
1950 births
People from Palakkad district
1996 Indian general election
India MPs 1996–1997
India MPs 1998–1999
India MPs 1999–2004
Indian Hindus
Lok Sabha members from Kerala
Kerala politicians